Switched-On Bach II is a musical album by Wendy Carlos, originally released under her birth name, Walter Carlos, in 1973 on Columbia Records and produced by Carlos and Rachel Elkind and is a sequel to the 1968 album Switched-On Bach.

In February 1974, Billboard reported that the album sold over 70,000 copies in its first five weeks of release.

Tracks 
All composed by Johann Sebastian Bach (except that the four pieces from the Notebook for Anna Magdalena Bach are either doubtful or spurious):

 Selections from Suite No. 2 in B minor, BWV 1067:
 Badinerie (1:25)
 Minuet (1:20)
 Bourrée (1:40)
 Two-Part Inventions:
 in A minor, BWV 784 (1:20)
 in A major, BWV 783 (1:10)
 "Sheep may safely graze", from Cantata No. 208, BWV 208 (5:00)
 Suite from Anna Magdalena Notebook:
 Musette in D major,  (1:10)
 Minuet in G major, BWV Anh. 114 (1:40)
 "Bist du bei mir", BWV 508 (2:15)
 Marche in D major,  (1:00)
 Brandenburg Concerto No. 5 in D major, BWV 1050:
 Allegro (10:45)
 Affetuoso (5:35)
 Allegro (4:50)

References

External links
 Switched-On Bach II, ESD 81622 at WendyCarlos.com

1973 albums
1970s classical albums
Wendy Carlos albums
Albums produced by Wendy Carlos
Albums produced by Rachel Elkind
Recordings of Johann Sebastian Bach
Sequel albums